This is a list of launches made by JAXA using H-II, H-IIA, H-IIB and H3 rockets.

Launch statistics

Rocket configurations

Launch sites

Launch outcomes

Launch history

Planned launches

Sources: Gunter's Space Page and Cabinet Office of Japan

References 

H-II seriesand H3
Lists of events in Japan
Mitsubishi Heavy Industries space launch vehicles